Garsaman or Garseman may refer to:
 Garsaman-e-Bala